is a Japanese economist and professor of Rissho University.

Yoshikawa was born in Tokyo.

He won the Nikkei Economic Book Award and the Suntory Award (1984), the Economist Award (1993) and the Yomiuri-Yoshino Sakuzo Award (2000).

Selected publications

Books

Journal articles

References

1951 births
Living people
People from Tokyo
20th-century  Japanese economists
21st-century  Japanese economists
State University of New York faculty
Academic staff of Osaka University
Academic staff of the University of Tokyo
Academic staff of Rissho University
University of Tokyo alumni
Yale University alumni
Presidents of the Japanese Economic Association
Recipients of the Medal with Purple Ribbon